ICT  (formerly known as Indian Country Today) is a daily digital news platform that covers the Indigenous world, including American Indians, Alaska Natives and First Nations.

It was founded in 1981 as a weekly print newspaper, The Lakota Times; the publication's name changed in 1992 to Indian Country Today. It was acquired in 1998 by Four Directions Media, an enterprise of the Oneida Nation of New York. In January 2011, ICT became Indian Country Today Media Network (ICTMN), an online multimedia news platform. In June 2014, ICTMN had 1,009,761 unique monthly visitors, according to Google Analytics; and Indian Country Todays Facebook page received more than 500,000 likes. In addition to the online news site, ICTMN published a weekly news magazine and special sections available online and in print. The name changed to ICT News in June 2022.

On Labor Day 2017, publication of new content was temporarily suspended to explore alternative business models. In October 2017, the Oneida Indian Nation of New York donated ICT to the National Congress of American Indians (NCAI). Vincent Schilling, ICTs former arts and entertainment editor, maintained the site and published articles until Indian Country Today came back online under NCAI's ownership.

On February 28, 2018, Indian Country Today resumed regular publication, with Mark Trahant (Shoshone-Bannock) as editor. Gradually new staff was added, with a renewed focus on Native American writers and editors.

In March 2020, Katie Oyan (Oglala Lakota) was announced as the publication's first managing editor. She was on loan from the Associated Press, and upon returning to the AP the first week of February 2021 she was succeeded by Jourdan Bennett-Begaye (Diné), who had served as Indian Country Todays Washington, DC, editor and, later, assistant managing editor.

In March 2021, the publication became independent from the NCAI. "This is an exciting time for Indian Country Today to become fiscally independent and to continue its tradition of an autonomous free press," NCAI President Fawn Sharp said in a press release regarding the change. "This is a new day for ICT, which has a long history as a premier source of news for and about Indigenous communities, written and produced by Indigenous journalists." The publication's current president and CEO is Karen Michel (Ho-Chunk).

History
ICT carries original news reporting on issues of interest to Native Americans and other readers interested in Indian Country.

 1981–1998: Indian Country Today was founded in 1981 as The Lakota Times by journalist Tim Giago, Oglala Lakota; Giago changed the publication's name in 1992 to Indian Country Today (motto: "The Nations' Leading American Indian News Source"). ICT was based on the Pine Ridge Indian Reservation but operated independently of Tribal government.

 1998–2017: In 1998, Giago sold Indian Country Today to Four Directions Media, Inc., an enterprise of the Oneida Nation of New York and the newspaper's headquarters moved to Canastota, New York. In 2011, operations moved to New York City and Indian Country Today became Indian Country Today Media Network (motto: "Serving the Nations | Celebrating the People"). In 2013, the printed newspaper ceased publication, replaced by digital-first online reporting and a weekly news magazine available online and in print. In October 2017, the Oneida Nation of New York donated ICT to the National Congress of American Indians (NCAI), which calls itself "the oldest, largest and most representative American Indian and Alaska Native organization."

 2018–2021: On February 28, 2018, after a hiatus during the transfer of ownership to NCAI, Indian Country Today announced its return (motto: "Digital. Indigenous. News"). "Indian Country Today is a daily digital news platform that covers the Indigenous world, including American Indians and Alaska Natives. Indian Country Today is the largest news site that covers Tribes and Native people throughout the Americas. Our primary focus is delivering news to a national audience via a mobile phone or the web."

On July 24, 2019, editor Mark Trahant and Indian Country Today headquarters moved to the campus of the Walter Cronkite School of Journalism and Mass Communications at Arizona State University in Phoenix. Trahant wrote on social media that he would be hiring a team to build a televised news program and improve ICTs national report. Associate Editor Vincent Schilling remained in the D.C. bureau.

By the end of the year, ICT had a bureau at Alaska Pacific University in Anchorage, in addition to its newsroom in Phoenix and its bureau in Washington, DC. In February, the San Manuel Band of Mission Indians awarded a grant of $1 million to Indian Country Today and became founding partner for a national news broadcast about American Indian and Alaska Native issues.

 March 26, 2021: Ownership of ICT was transferred from NCAI to an Arizona nonprofit, IndiJ Public Media. Karen Michel is president of the media company and serves as ICTs publisher and chief executive officer.

On June 23, 2022, Indian Country Today was renamed to ICT News.

Staff
Indian Country Today is owned by IndiJ Public Media. Karen Lincoln Michel, Ho-Chunk, is president of IndiJ Public Media and Indian Country Today.

Board of directors: Karen Lincoln Michel (Ho-Chunk); former U.S. Assistant Interior Secretary Larry EchoHawk (Pawnee); and Rhonda LeValdo (Acoma Pueblo).

Newsroom: Mark Trahant (Shoshone-Bannock), editor; Jourdan Bennett-Begaye (Diné), managing editor; Patty Talahongva (Hopi), executive producer; Tomas Karmelo Amaya (Yoeme/A:shiwi/Rarámuri descent), creative director; Vincent Schilling (Akwesasne Mohawk), associate editor; Kolby KickingWoman (Blackfeet/Gros Ventre), reporter-producer; Aliyah Chavez (Kewa Pueblo), reporter-producer; Joaqlin Estus (Tlingit), national correspondent (Anchorage); and Dalton Walker (Red Lake Anishinaabe), national correspondent.

Notable stories
 In 2005, an Indian Country Today editorial, "Hurricane Katrina Uncovers a Tale of Two Americas," was quoted by South African President Thabo Mbeki in a letter to the ANC Today, published by the African National Congress.
 Indian Country Today extensively covered the Adoptive Couple v. Baby Girl case, also known as the 2013 Supreme Court of the United States "Baby Veronica" case, in which an Oklahoma father, a citizen of the Cherokee Nation, sought custody of his daughter Veronica, who was being adopted by a non-Native couple. The coverage included a guest editorial by the president of the Charleston, South Carolina, branch of the National Association for the Advancement of Colored People.
 On June 5, 2014, President Barack Obama wrote a column for Indian Country Today titled "On My Upcoming Trip to Indian Country", describing how he and his wife Michelle planned to visit the Standing Rock Indian Reservation in North Dakota that month.
 In December 2014, Indian Country Today published a series of articles on the controversial 2015 National Defense Authorization Act "land swap" provision that would give land sacred to the San Carlos Apache Indian Reservation in Arizona to Resolution Copper Mine [RCM], a joint venture owned by Rio Tinto and BHP. More than 104,000 people had signed a petition to President Obama, "We the People | Stop Apache Land Grab" to which the White House gave an official response.
 Indian Country Today has extensively covered the Native American mascot controversy and the use of Native American images in names and sports. The publication has featured numerous stories and editorials on the Washington Redskins name controversy and Washington NFL team owner Dan Snyder.
 Since before 2016, ICT reported on issues related to the Dakota Access Pipeline project, which proposed to put an oil pipeline extending through four states below the Missouri River. The Standing Rock Sioux objected to the Army Corps of Engineers' acceptance of less than a full Environmental Impact Statement, saying the project threatened their water quality and would destroy ancient artifacts and burial grounds. Standing Rock Sioux sought an injunction to halt construction of the pipeline. The case attracted national and international attention and coverage. After a federal court refused the injunction, the Department of Justice, Department of Interior and Army Corps of Engineers entered the case at the national level, halting construction temporarily. Standing Rock Sioux protesters at the site were joined by activists from hundreds of other Tribes and supporters, including indigenous peoples from South America. ICT published its first "single-subject, event-driven edition in [its] history" in October 2016, based on the reporting done and exploring the many complex issues related to the project and protests.
 On November 5, 2018, Indian Country Today teamed with First Nations Experience and Native Voice One in broadcasting and streaming the first national news report focused on Native American candidates from coast to coast. A team of 18 correspondents reported from sites across the United States, including Alaska and Hawaii. The election desk was anchored by Mark Trahant, editor of Indian Country Today.
 Indian Country Today began broadcasting in March 2020 a 30-minute news program. It is now carried by PBS stations, presented by Arizona PBS, and produced in Studio A of the Walter Cronkite School of Journalism and Mass Communication at Arizona State University. The ICT Newscast is anchored by Aliyah Chavez, Kewa Pueblo.

In January 2022, Jourdan Bennett-Begaye was named as editor. Trahant moved to an editor-at-large position and is writing about Indigenous economics.

Awards
Indian Country Today has won numerous awards at the Native American Journalists Association. In 2014, ICT earned 17 awards, including Best Digital Publication for its 12-page digital newsletter and first place for General Excellence.  In 2013, ICTMN won 11 awards at the conference.

Notable writers, editors, contributors
Some current and former Indian Country Today staff writers and contributors include:

 Suzette Brewer (Cherokee Nation), former public affairs officer for the National Museum of the American Indian. She received recognition for her in-depth coverage of the "Baby Veronica" case and other stories related to the Indian Child Welfare Act (ICWA)
 Rob Capriccioso (Sault Ste. Marie Tribe of Chippewa) served as ICTs Washington, DC, bureau chief.
 Terri Crawford Hansen (Winnebago Tribe of Nebraska) is a science and environment journalist who has reported on the effects of climate breakdown and adaptation planning in Indian country for Indian Country Today since 2007
 Steven Newcomb (Shawnee/Lenape descent) co-founder and co-director of the Indigenous Law Institute in California
 Steve Russell (Cherokee Nation), associate professor emeritus of criminal justice at Indiana University Bloomington
 Simon Moya-Smith, Oglala Lakota former ICT culture editor. On October 15, 2018, CNN published Moya-Smith's opinion piece in response to Senator Elizabeth Warren's press release asserting that less than 1 percent of Native American DNA verified her claims of such ancestry. Moya-Smith noted that he personally agreed with Warren's political stance more often than not, but also criticized her for what he characterized as her silence on social problems plaguing Native communities and the timing of her DNA announcement: "For years, when I was the culture editor at Indian Country Today Media Network, we requested interviews with Warren, but not once did she accept our numerous invitations for comment or explanation regarding her alleged ancestry. She simply ignored us."
 Larry Spotted Crow Mann (Nipmuc) 
 Mark Trahant (Shoshone-Bannock) is a former Atwood Chair of Journalism at the University of Alaska Anchorage and the Charles Johnson Professor at the University of North Dakota, former president of the Native American Journalists Association, and former executive news editor of The Salt Lake Tribune. He writes a regular column on national and regional politics, noting issues that affect Indian Country. He is the author of The Last Great Battle and Portraits of Our Nobler Selves.
 Marty Two Bulls Sr. (Oglala Lakota), cartoonist and satirist. In 2013, he was profiled by the Associated Press. In 2017, he was a finalist for the Herblock Prize, winning $5,000 for his submissions. He was a finalist for the Pulitzer Prize in 2021.

References

External links
 
 

1981 establishments in South Dakota
Indigenous rights publications
Native American magazines
Newspapers published in New York (state)
Publications established in 1981